A Massachusetts general election was held on November 6, 1990 in the Commonwealth of Massachusetts.

The election included:
 statewide elections for United States Senator, Governor, Lieutenant Governor, Attorney General, Secretary of the Commonwealth, Treasurer, and Auditor;
 district elections for U.S. Representatives, State Representatives, State Senators, and Governor's Councillors; and
 ballot questions at the state and local levels.

Democratic and Republican candidates were selected in party primaries held September 19, 1990.

Governor & Lieutenant Governor

Republicans William Weld and Paul Cellucci were elected Governor and Lieutenant Governor, respectively, over Democratic candidates John Silber and Marjorie Clapprood. Weld's victory was the first for a Republican since 1970.

Attorney General

Democrat Scott Harshbarger was elected Attorney General. He defeated incumbent James Shannon in the Democratic primary and Republican William C. Sawyer in the general election.

Democratic primary

Candidates
Scott Harshbarger, Middlesex County District Attorney
James Shannon, incumbent Attorney General and former U.S. Representative from Lowell

Results

Republican primary

Candidates
Guy Carbone
William C. Sawyer

Results

General election

Secretary of the Commonwealth

Incumbent Secretary of the Commonwealth Michael J. Connolly defeated Republican Paul McCarthy and Independent Barbara F. Ahearn in the general election.

Former Celtics star Dave Cowens entered the race as a Republican, but because he did not register by June 5, 1989, he was unable to appear on the primary ballot and dropped out.

General election

Candidates
Barbara F. Ahearn (Independent High Tech)
Michael J. Connolly, incumbent Secretary since 1979 (Democratic)
Paul McCarthy (Republican)

Results

Treasurer and Receiver-General

Incumbent Treasurer and Receiver-General Robert Q. Crane did not run for re-election. Republican Joe Malone defeated Democrat State Representative William F. Galvin and Independent C. David Nash in the general election.

Democratic primary

Candidates
 William F. Galvin, State Representative from Allston–Brighton, Boston
George Keverian, Speaker of the Massachusetts House and State Representative from Everett
Dick Kraus, State Senator from Arlington

Results

General election

Auditor

Democrat A. Joseph DeNucci was re-elected Auditor. He defeated Republican Douglas J. Murray and Independent candidate Steven K. Sherman.

United States Senator

Democratic incumbent John Kerry was re-elected over Republican Jim Rappaport.

Ballot questions

Question 1
Proposed Amendment to the Constitution – The proposed constitutional amendment would repeal the constitutional provision that a state census be taken and used as the basis for determining state representative, senatorial, and councilor districts. The proposed constitutional amendment would provide that the federal census shall be the basis for determining such districts.

Question 2
Law Proposed by Initiative Petition - The proposed law sought to place restrictions on the State’s use of consultants. It sought various limits on the amount of profit, overhead charges and expenses that the State could pay consultants. The duration of consultant contracts was for two years and any extension to one year, and such contracts could be changed only if payments exceeded the original contract. The proposed initiative sought to limit to $100,000 the amount the State could pay on a consultant contract with an individual and would require all other consultant contracts in excess of $25,000 to be awarded through competitive bidding. It sought to prohibit consultants from supervising State employees, and it would limit the use of consultants as substitutes for State employee positions.

Question 3
Law Proposed by Initiative Petition – The proposed initiative would have changed the state income tax rate, affected language contained in certain tax provisions, and regulated the setting of fees by state agencies and authorities.

Question 4
Law Proposed by Initiative Petition – This proposed initiative sought to change the state election laws governing the establishment of political parties and the nomination of candidates.

Question 5
Law Proposed by Initiative Petition – This proposed initiative sought to regulate the distribution to cities and towns of the Local Aid Fund, which consists of at least 40% of the revenue generated by the state income, sales, and corporate taxes, as well as the balance of the State Lottery Fund.

References

External links
 

General
Massachusetts